The 1970–71 season was the 87th football season in which Dumbarton competed at a Scottish national level, entering the Scottish Football League, the Scottish Cup and the Scottish League Cup.  In addition Dumbarton competed in the Stirlingshire Cup.

Scottish Second Division

Dumbarton had their best league campaign in over 10 years - including an unbeaten home record - the first for over 30 years, although with only 4 wins in 18 away matches, in the end it became a case of 'catch-up' - 8 wins in their last 10 games not being enough to challenge the leaders. Nevertheless, it was a creditable 4th-place finish, with 44 points, 12 behind champions Partick Thistle.

Scottish League Cup

Five wins and a draw from the six sectional games meant an easy section qualification.  Then Partick Thistle were dispatched in the quarter final, with the mighty Celtic waiting in the semi final - and it was only after an extra time 0-0 draw that Dumbarton eventually succumbed by the odd goal in seven in the replay again after extra time.

Scottish Cup
In the Scottish Cup, Dumbarton had a disappointing second round loss to Stranraer.

Stirlingshire Cup
Locally, in the Stirlingshire Cup, Dumbarton were knocked out in the first round by Clydebank.

Friendly

Player statistics

Squad 

|}

Source:

Transfers
Amongst those players joining and leaving the club were the following

Players in

Players out 

Source:

Reserve team
For the first time in eight years, Dumbarton played an official reserve team which competed in the Combined Reserve League.  The league was played in two series, and reporting of results is scarce - but both series were won by Partick Thistle.

References

Dumbarton F.C. seasons
Scottish football clubs 1970–71 season